Žarko Marković (born 1 June 1986) is a Montenegrin-born Qatari handball player who plays for Al Rayyan and the Qatar national team.

Club career
After starting his career at Serbian club Jugović, Marković spent three seasons in Hungary with Tatabánya and MKB Veszprém. He later also played for Budućnost Podgorica, Al Ahli Jeddah, Metalurg Skopje, Frisch Auf Göppingen, HSV Hamburg, El Jaish, Zagreb, Al Duhail, Al Wakrah, Al Gharafa and Al Shamal.

International career

Youth
At youth level, Marković won two gold medals for Serbia and Montenegro. He was a member of the winning squad at the 2004 European Under-18 Championship. Subsequently, Marković helped the nation win the 2005 World Under-19 Championship.

Senior
A Montenegro international since its inception, Marković participated at the 2008 European Championship in the nation's debut appearance in major tournaments. He was later omitted from the national team for the 2013 World Championship, before switching allegiance to Qatar. After being cleared to play, Marković made his debut for the Qatar national team at the 2015 World Championship, helping them finish as runners-up. He also won the gold medal at the 2016 Asian Championship and took part in the 2016 Summer Olympics.

Honours
Metalurg Skopje
 Macedonian Handball Super League: 2011–12
Al Duhail
 Qatar Handball League: 2017–18
Al Gharafa
 Arab Handball Championship of Champions: 2019
Al Shamal
 Arab Handball Championship of Winners' Cup: 2020

References

External links

 EHF record
 MKSZ record
 Olympic record

1986 births
Living people
Sportspeople from Cetinje
Naturalised citizens of Qatar
Qatari people of Montenegrin descent
Montenegrin male handball players
Qatari male handball players
Olympic handball players of Qatar
Handball players at the 2016 Summer Olympics
RK Jugović players
Veszprém KC players
Frisch Auf Göppingen players
RK Zagreb players
Handball-Bundesliga players
Expatriate handball players
Montenegrin expatriate sportspeople in Hungary
Montenegrin expatriate sportspeople in Saudi Arabia
Montenegrin expatriate sportspeople in North Macedonia
Montenegrin expatriate sportspeople in Germany
Montenegrin expatriate sportspeople in Qatar
Montenegrin expatriate sportspeople in Croatia